Dostana ( in Hindi-Urdu) may refer to:
Dostana (1980 film), an Indian film by Raj Khosla
Dostana (2008 film), an Indian film by Tarun Mansukhani

See also
 Dost (disambiguation)